Carlo Borromeo is the Italian name of Charles Borromeo (1538–1584), Archbishop of Milan and Catholic saint.

Carlo Borromeo may also refer to:

 Carlo Borromeo (bishop) (died 1540), Roman Catholic prelate 
 Luigi Carlo Borromeo (1893–1975), Italian bishop of the Roman Catholic Diocese of Pesaro